Cooks Creek may refer to:

Streams
 Cooks Creek (Antigua), in Saint Mary and Saint John, Antigua, Antigua and Barbuda
 Cooks Creek (Fisher River tributary), in Surry County, North Carolina, United States
 Cooks Creek (Delaware River tributary), in Bucks County, Pennsylvania, United States

Communities
 Cooks Creek, Manitoba, Canada

Other uses